María Auxiliadora Clavier (1934 – 2015), also called Maruja Clavier, was one of the first Venezuelan nuclear oncologists. She was a founder of the Dr. Raúl Vera Vera Oncology Unit, at the time a novel setting to provide comprehensive care to cancer patients in the country using nuclear medicine.

Biography 
Maruja Clavier was born in 1934 in the Anzoátegui State located in the northeastern region of Venezuela. She began her baccalaureate education at the Colegio Nuestra Señora de La Consolación in Barcelona, Venezuela and completed it in Goshen, New York. Upon returning to Venezuela, she revalidated her work at the Liceo Fermín Toro. Later she enrolled at the School of Medicine of the University of Los Andes, and then transferred to the School of Medicine of the Central University of Venezuela, where she graduated as a physician in 1960.

Clavier's interest in the medicinal power of nuclear medicine was sparked when she translated from English into Spanish the book Physical Foundations of Radiology by Edith Quimby (et al.), who was one of the founders of this medical specialty. In 1963, Clavier graduated with the first class of radiation oncologists in the country, and the following year she founded the Eastern Chapter of the Society of Oncology in Barcelona, Venezuela. She served as its first president.

She helped create the Dr. Raúl Vera Vera Oncology Unit, one of the first to provide comprehensive care to cancer patients.

Personal life 
Clavier had five children. Two of her sons, Eduardo and Antonio Benavides, went on to pursue careers as Venezuelan oncologists.

Translations 

 Glasser, O.; Quimby, E. H.; Taylor, L. S.; Weatherwax, J. L. (1944), Physical Foundations of Radiology, New York: Hoeber

Memberships 

 Venezuelan Society of Oncology, President of the Eastern Chapter, 1964
 Venezuelan Mastology Society, Member of the Electoral Committee 2003-2005

References

External links
 VESSURI, HEBE M. C. “The Search for a Scientific Community in Venezuela: From Isolation to Applied Research.” Minerva, vol. 22, no. 2, 1984, pp. 196–235. JSTOR, www.jstor.org/stable/41820563. Accessed 12 June 2020.

1934 births
2015 deaths
Venezuelan women physicians
Venezuelan oncologists